Mary Sears may refer to:

 Mary Sears, birth name of Mary Sears McHenry  (1834–1912) American community organizer
 Mary Sears (oceanographer) (1905–1997), United States Naval Reserve officer and oceanographer
 , a 2001 United States Navy oceanographic survey ship named after her
 Mary Sears (swimmer) (born 1939), American swimmer